Gordon Henry Simms (born 23 March 1981) is a Northern Irish former professional footballer who played as a defender. He played in the Football League for Hartlepool United.

Career
Simms made his Irish League debut aged 15 for his hometown club, Larne, before his performances soon earned him a move to England. He signed for English First Division side Wolverhampton Wanderers in Summer 1997 for £40,000.

During almost four years at Molineux, he failed to make a first team appearances, and departed for Third Division Hartlepool United on a free transfer in March 2001 after completing a trial with them.

The defender made his Football League debut on 15 September 2001 when he came on as a substitute during a goalless draw at Southend United. This was the first of eleven appearances during the season as the club reached the play-offs. However, he made only two appearances further appearances during the following season, the last being in a 0–5 exit from the Football League Trophy at the hands of Tranmere.

During this time he won fourteen caps for the Northern Ireland under-21 side. The first coming on 27 March 2001 in a European qualifier against Bulgaria. He had previously represented them at schoolboy, under-18 and under-16 level.

Simms was released by Hartlepool at the end of the 2002–03 season and returned to his native Northern Ireland to join Derry City. However, he soon departed on loan to Ballymena United in early 2004; a move made permanent that summer.

After two and a half years at The Showgrounds, he signed a short-term deal with Finn Harps in the League of Ireland First Division in January 2007. At the conclusion of this, he returned to English football by signing for non-league club Hednesford Town for the 2007–08 season.

References

External links

Profile at Northern Ireland's Football Greats

1981 births
Living people
People from Larne
Association footballers from Northern Ireland
Northern Ireland under-21 international footballers
Association football defenders
Wolverhampton Wanderers F.C. players
Hartlepool United F.C. players
Ballymena United F.C. players
Finn Harps F.C. players
Hednesford Town F.C. players
English Football League players
League of Ireland players
NIFL Premiership players
Northern Premier League players